

In taxonomy, Rhodothalassium is a genus of the Rhodobacteraceae. Up to now there is only one species of this genus known (Rhodothalassium salexigens).

References

Further reading

Scientific journals

Scientific books

Scientific databases

External links

Rhodobacteraceae
Bacteria genera
Monotypic bacteria genera